"Chinatown" is a song by English singer Liam Gallagher. The song was released as the second single from Gallagher's debut solo studio album, As You Were, released on 6 October 2017. It is one of two tracks on the album on which Gallagher does not take a writing credit. Co-writer Michael Tighe stated that the song's sound was inspired by the style of former bandmate Jeff Buckley.

Music video
The music video was filmed in London and features Liam drifting by a graffiti-covered underpass and gazing out at the Palace of Westminster. One scene features Liam staring at a wall with the words "We Stand United With Manchester" on it (acting as a  tribute to the victims of the Manchester Arena bombing). At sunset, he navigates the song's titular district, past busy restaurants and supermarkets, as the music video's director, Charlie Lightening zooms around with his camera.

The music video was directed by Charlie Lightening and produced by Daniel Lightening. The music video currently has over 5 million views on YouTube.

Charts

References

External links

2017 singles
2017 songs
Liam Gallagher songs
Songs written by Andrew Wyatt
Songs written by Michael Tighe
Warner Records singles
Song recordings produced by Andrew Wyatt